Help Yourself may refer to:

Films
 Help Yourself (1920 film), a 1920 American comedy film directed by Hugo Ballin
 Help Yourself (film), a 1932 British comedy film

Literature
Help Yourself (book), a 2001 book by Dave Pelzer
Help Yourself (play), 1936 Broadway play by John J. Coman

Music

Groups
 Help Yourself (band), a 1970s rock group

Albums
 Help Yourself (Tom Jones album), 1968
 Help Yourself (Faye Wong album), 1997
 Help Yourself (Julian Lennon album), a 1991 album by Julian Lennon and its title song
 Help Yourself (Peggy Scott-Adams album)

Songs
 "Help Yourself" (Tom Jones song), Tom Jones' cover of a popular song and the name of Jones' eponymously titled 1968 album  
 "Help Yourself" (Amy Winehouse song), a 2003 song by Amy Winehouse
 "Help Yourself (To All of My Lovin')", a 1968 single by James & Bobby Purify
 "Help Yourself", a 1978 single by Brass Construction
 "Help Yourself", an original song by Sad Brad Smith for the Oscar-nominated film, Up in the Air (2009)